Martha Marlow, is an Australian singer, songwriter, artist and musician. Marlow's debut studio album, Medicine Man was released in May 2021 and received a nomination for ARIA Award for Best Blues and Roots Album at the 2021 ARIA Music Awards.

Early life
Martha Marlow grew up in Sydney's Eastern suburbs, surrounded by a family of musicians.

Marlow studied at the National Art School of Sydney. She grew up in the same house that the Bee Gees lived in before they moved to London. She lives with a range of illnesses including fibromyalgia, lupus and  Ehlers–Danlos Syndrome.

Career
In 2015, Marlow covered Randy Newman's "Feels Like Home" for a QANTAS commercial.

2021: Medicine Man
On 19 March 2021, Marlow released her debut single "Don't Want to Grow Up".

In May 2021 Marlow released her debut album Medicine Man. The 13-track original composition album was recorded with a 17 piece string ensemble, led by Veronique Serret and conducted by Daniel Denholm and produced by Jonathan Zwartz and Martha Marlow.
The album received nominations for the ARIA Award for Best Blues and Roots Album and an Australian Women in Music Awards.

2022: Touring and Queen of the Night
Throughout 2022, Marlow toured 'Medicine Man' and was nominated for further awards. She also exhibited her watercolour painting in an exhibition at Sydney's King Street Gallery. Marlow also began work on her second album, 'Queen of the Night', with pianist Chris Abrahams.

Discography

Studio albums

Notes

Awards and nominations

AIR Awards
The Australian Independent Record Awards (commonly known informally as AIR Awards) is an annual awards night to recognise, promote and celebrate the success of Australia's Independent Music sector.

! 
|-
| rowspan="2"| 2022
| Martha Marlow
| Breakthrough Independent Artist of the Year
| 
| rowspan="2"| 
|-
| Medicine Man
| Best Independent Blues and Roots Album or EP
|

ARIA Music Awards
The ARIA Music Awards is an annual awards ceremony that recognises excellence, innovation, and achievement across all genres of Australian music.

! 
|-
| 2021
| Medicine Man
| ARIA Award for Best Blues and Roots Album
| 
|
|}

Australian Music Prize
The Australian Music Prize (the AMP) is an annual award of $30,000 given to an Australian band or solo artist in recognition of the merit of an album released during the year of award. It commenced in 2005.

|-
! scope="row"| 2021
| Medicine Man
| Australian Music Prize
|

Australian Women in Music Awards
The Australian Women in Music Awards (commonly known informally as AWMA) is an annual awards ceremony and conference celebrating the contributions of women in all areas of the Australian music industry. The commenced in 2018.

! 
|-
! scope="row"| 2021
| Herself
| Emerging Artist Award
| 
| 
|}

References

21st-century Australian women singers
21st-century Australian singers
Australian women singer-songwriters
Living people
Year of birth missing (living people)